Christian Ernst Stahl (21 June 1848 – 3 December 1919) was a German botanist who was a native of Schiltigheim, Alsace.

Academic career 
He studied botany at the University of Strasbourg with Pierre-Marie-Alexis Millardet (1838-1902), and at the University of Halle under Anton de Bary (1831-1888). He earned his doctorate in 1874, and later became an assistant to Julius von Sachs (1832-1897) at the University of Würzburg. He was appointed an associate professor at the University of Strasbourg, and after just one year, he attained the chair of botany at the University of Jena in 1881. Here, he also served as director of the botanical garden.

During the winter of 1889-1890, he took a scientific expedition to Ceylon and Java, and in 1894 travelled to Mexico. Two of his better-known students were Hans Adolf Eduard Driesch (1867-1941) and Hans Kniep (1881-1930).

Botanical research 
Stahl is remembered for his pioneer experiments in the field of ecophysiology, as well as research involving the developmental history of lichens. He was able to induce the synthesis of the lichen Endocarpon pusillum from spores and algal material, including formation of apothecia, and thus he made a strong experimental case for the hypothesis by Simon Schwendener (1829-1919) that lichens are twin fungal-algal organisms.

Other contributions by Stahl included studies concerning the influence of light on plants — he described the anatomy of sun and shade leaves; the effects of moisture and dryness on the formation of leaves, and the role of stomata in xerophytes and mesophytes. He conducted important research on the symbiotic relationship between mycorrhizal fungi and tree roots, and also worked on plant defense against snail and slug herbivory and a plethora of other botanical and ecological questions.

Selected scientific works 
 Entwickelung und Anatomie der Lenticellen. (Evolution and anatomy of lenticel); Leipzig 1873. 
 Beiträge zur Entwickelungsgeschichte der Flechten. (Contributions to the evolutionary history of lichens); Leipzig 1877. 
 Über den Einfluß von Richtung und Stärke der Beleuchtung auf einige Bewegungserscheinungen im Pflanzenreich. - (On the influence of direction and intensity of illumination involving movement phenomena in the plant kingdom); Leipzig 1880.
 Über sogenannte Kompaßpflanzen. (treatise on compass plants); Jena 1883. 
 Über den Einfluß des sonnigen oder schattigen Standortes auf die Ausbildung der Laubblätter. (Concerning sun and shade on the formation of leaves on deciduous trees); Jena 1883. 
 Einfluß des Lichtes auf den Geotropismus einiger Pflanzenorgane. (Influence of light in regards to geotropism of plants); Berlin 1884. 
 Zur Biologie der Myxomyceten (The biology of slime mold). Leipzig 1884. 
 Pflanzen und Schnecken. Eine biologische Studie über die Schutzmittel der Pflanzen gegen Schneckenfraß. (Plants and snails, a biological study regarding protection of plants against slugs); Jena 1888.

References

 Mägdefrau, Karl (1992) Geschichte der Botanik: Leben und Leistung grosser Forscher. Stuttgart: Gustav Fischer Verlag.

19th-century German botanists
1848 births
1919 deaths
People from Schiltigheim
Academic staff of the University of Strasbourg
Academic staff of the University of Jena
20th-century German botanists
Chemical ecologists
Members of the Royal Society of Sciences in Uppsala